Dragan Kapčević (born 10 November 1985) is a Bosnian-Herzegovinian footballer who plays for Räppe GOIF as a forward.

Club career
He first came to Sweden in 2006 when he and his brother joined third-tier club Anundsjö IF. After the club was relegated, he went on loan to Sollefteå GIF. During his time there he got into a car accident where the vehicle flipped over and he got stuck underneath. The prognosis was that his footballing career might be over. However, the next year he made a short, one-game comeback for his old club Anundsjö, where he scored two goals. And then the following year he made a full return to playing with Sollefteå. There he performed well enough to get noticed by Allsvenskan club Gefle IF, who signed him to a 1.5-year contract.

He later played for Östers Växjö.

References

External links
Stats - Svenskfotboll
Svenskafans profile

1985 births
Living people
People from Prozor-Rama
Association football forwards
Bosnia and Herzegovina footballers
HŠK Zrinjski Mostar players
Gefle IF players
IK Brage players
Husqvarna FF players
Östersunds FK players
IK Sirius Fotboll players
Östers IF players
Ettan Fotboll players
Allsvenskan players
Superettan players
Division 2 (Swedish football) players
Bosnia and Herzegovina expatriate footballers
Expatriate footballers in Sweden
Bosnia and Herzegovina expatriate sportspeople in Sweden